KNSH (1550 AM) was a radio station serving the Amarillo, Texas, area. This station broadcast on AM frequency 1550 kHz and was under ownership of Cumulus Media. Its studios were located at the Amarillo Building downtown on Polk Street, and its transmitter tower was based in Canyon, where the station is licensed to serve.

History
In January 2008, it began airing hot talk John Clay Wolfe and the daily nooner weekdays at 12 from ESPN affiliate KSEY from Vernon, Texas.

KZRK was airing a news/talk format before the format change in 2007, then carrying Spanish sports before going silent in September 2012. They came back on the air in October 2012 with a simulcast of sports-formatted KPUR 1440 AM Amarillo, Texas.

On January 3, 2012, KZRK changed their format to talk, branded as "Talk 1550".

On December 31, 2013, KZRK changed their call letters to KNSH.

The facility had experienced issues with its antenna tuning unit since 2018, resulting in prolonged periods of silence. On February 20, 2020, KNSH swapped callsigns with KLSZ-FM, a Nash FM country station in Fort Smith, Arkansas. Cumulus then surrendered the license for newly-recalled KLSZ to the FCC on February 25, and the FCC cancelled the license on February 27.

References

External links
 

NSH (AM)
Cumulus Media radio stations
Defunct radio stations in the United States
Radio stations established in 1962
1962 establishments in Texas
Radio stations disestablished in 2020
2020 disestablishments in Texas
NSH